Duncker is a surname. Notable people with the surname include:

Alexander Duncker (1813–1879), German publisher and bookseller
Carl Friedrich Wilhelm Duncker (1781–1869), German publisher
Franz Duncker (1822–1888), German publisher, politician, and social reformer.
Georg Duncker (1870–1953), German ichthyologist
Hermann Duncker (1874–1960), German Marxist politician, historian and social scientist
Joachim Zachris Duncker (1774–1809), Swedish soldier
Karl Duncker (1903–1940), German psychologist
Käte Duncker (1871–1953), German activist and politician
Maximilian Wolfgang Duncker (1811–1886), German historian and politician
Patricia Duncker (born 1951), British novelist and academic
Wolfgang Duncker (1909–1942), German journalist and film critic

See also
Dunker (disambiguation)